The 2017 Lamar Cardinals football team represented Lamar University in the 2017 NCAA Division I FCS football season. The Cardinals were led by first-year head coach Mike Schultz and play their home games at Provost Umphrey Stadium. They played as a member of the Southland Conference. They finished the season 2–9, 1–8 in Southland play to finish in tenth place.

Schedule

Game summaries

at North Texas

Sources:

Texas–Permian Basin

Sources:

at Northwestern State

Sources:

at Southeastern Louisiana

Sources:

Nicholls State

Sources:

at Incarnate Word

Sources:

at Sam Houston State

Sources:

Stephen F. Austin

Sources:

Central Arkansas

Sources:

at Houston Baptist

Sources:

McNeese State

Sources:

References

Lamar
Lamar Cardinals football seasons
Lamar Cardinals football